The Fright at Tristor is an adventure module for the Dungeons & Dragons fantasy role-playing game.  The 32-page adventure was published by Wizards of the Coast in 2001 and distributed primarily through the company's Role-Playing Games Association.  It was designed for use as either an introductory module for the Living Greyhawk campaign or as a generic D&D adventure for low-level characters.

Synopsis 
The plot of The Fright at Tristor begins with a mention of the brutal murders occurring in the hamlet of Tristor, in the northern reaches of the Theocracy of the Pale. The townsfolk fear that they may be the next target of these attacks.  The party has been hired to investigate, a reward being offered if they can stop these murders occurring.  Some believe the source of the attacks to be a band of orcs following a mysterious entity known as "The Watcher."  When outlying farms are attacked outright, it is up to the adventurers to halt these killings and save the town.

Publication history
The Fright at Tristor was designed by Keith Polster, and was published in 2000. Cover art was by Rebecca Guay, with interior art by Matthew Mitchell.

References

External links 
The Fright at Tristor at the TSR Archive
The Fright at Tristor at the Pen & Paper RPG Database

Dungeons & Dragons modules
Greyhawk modules
Role-playing game supplements introduced in 2001